The Big Coins is a group of sculptures located in Deakin, Australian Capital Territory next to the Royal Australian Mint, depicting the coins of the Australian dollar.

The circle on the left is not a coin, but shows "Est. 1965", denoting the year the Royal Australian Mint was opened.

References 

Buildings and structures in Canberra
Australian Megasculptures